Stokely Hathaway (born November 12, 1990) is an American professional wrestling manager and former professional wrestler currently signed to All Elite Wrestling (AEW), where he is the manager of The Firm. He was also previously known for his work at Evolve and Ring of Honor, as well as his time in WWE on the NXT brand as manager to the Diamond Mine using the ring name Malcolm Bivens.

Professional wrestling career

Ring of Honor (2014–2015)
On April 18, 2014, Hathaway had the first match of his career, teaming with Moose as they unsuccessfully challenged The Brutal Burgers. He soon became a member of Prince Nana's villainous stable The Embassy. He adopted the managing role and performed for a while under the name Ramon, where  he most notably managed Moose. On March 28, 2015, Hathaway made his last appearance at ROH.

Independent circuit (2016–2019)
Stokely Hathaway started on the indie circuit in 2016 after leaving Ring of Honor, working for companies such as Beyond Wrestling. Hathaway managed a group called "The Dream Team," which consisted of Maxwell Jacob Friedman (MJF), Faye Jackson (the First Lady of The Dream Team), and Thomas Sharp. Hathaway was involved in a rivalry with Orange Cassidy.

Evolve (2016–2018)
On April 2, 2016, at EVOLVE 59, Hathaway debuted in Evolve as TJP's manager, where he unsuccessfully challenged Tommy End. After a brief stint managing Timothy Thatcher, Hathaway became a member of EVOLVE's leading stable Catch Point, remaining in a managerial role. Hathaway had his first Evolve match  at Evolve  110, where he teamed with Chris Dickinson and Dominic Garrini in a losing effort against The Skulk. At Evolve  111, Hathaway teamed with Dickinson, where they unsuccessfully challenged Tracy Williams. Hathaway and Williams' careers were on the line in an "I Quit" match, and Hathaway's career with Evolve  ended as a result of the loss. Although Hathaway had to leave Evolve  after Evolve  111, he made a surprise appearance on September 8, 2018, where he unsuccessfully challenged Chris Dickinson, his final Evolve  appearance.

Major League Wrestling (2017–2018)
In 2017, Stokely started in Major League Wrestling (MLW) as a manager of Black Friday Management. Hathaway managed Low Ki during the time before Major League Wrestling, secured their television deal with BeIN Sports in March 2018. Due to already having a television deal with Evolve Wrestling Stokley Hathaway, Matt Riddle, Darby Allin, and Priscilla Kelly all had to leave MLW once their television tapings started. MLW wrote Stokley Hathaway off of TV by him being kidnapped by random kidnappers. Later in 2018 Stokley resurfaced in MLW in the crowd, however after that single appearance he did not appear on MLW television again.

WWE (2019–2022)
On March 11, 2019, WWE announced the signing of Hathaway, revealing that he was already at the Performance Center. He started as the manager to Babatunde under the name of Court Moore, he later changed his name to Malcolm Bivens and began to manage wrestlers like Jermaine Haley. At the May 16 NXT house show, Hathaway started going by the new name and managed the team Rinku Singh and Saurav Gurjar. He began to work on NXT's weekly show as the villainous manager of Singh and Gurjar as Bivens Enterprises, but the storyline was dropped and Bivens was taken off of television. He returned in December, managing Tyler Rust. On the June 22, 2021, episode of NXT, Bivens and Rust were revealed to be a part of the Diamond Mine stable along with Hachiman and Roderick Strong. Hathaway was released by WWE on April 29, 2022. He had reportedly turned down a contract renewal offer prior to his release.

All Elite Wrestling (2022–present) 
Stokely Hathaway made his debut in All Elite Wrestling (AEW) at Double or Nothing. He appeared at the end of a match between TBS Champion Jade Cargill and Anna Jay, aligning himself with Cargill. In the lead up to All Out 2022, Hathaway started courting wrestlers such as Ethan Page, Lee Moriarty, Colten Gunn, Austin Gunn, and Big Bill to be his new clients. Hathaway and his clients then attacked the Casino Ladder match, taking out every competitor in the ring, clearing the way for the just entering and masked Joker. At the end of the PPV's main event, the Joker revealed himself to be Maxwell Jacob Friedman. On the September 14 episode of AEW Dynamite, Hathaway revealed the name of his group to be "The Firm" and that they were MJF's "retainer team" helping him whenever he would need them.

Championships and accomplishments
Alpha-1 Wrestling
A1 Outer Limits Championship (1 time)

References

External links 

Living people
All Elite Wrestling personnel
American male professional wrestlers
African-American male professional wrestlers
Sportspeople from New York City
21st-century African-American people
Professional wrestling managers and valets
People from Harlem
1990 births